Friedelin is a triterpenoid chemical compound found in Azima tetracantha, Orostachys japonica, and Quercus stenophylla. Friedelin is also found in the roots of the Cannabis plant.

References

External links 
 

Triterpenes